The swimming competitions at the 2008 Summer Olympics took place from 9 to 17 August 2008 at the Beijing National Aquatics Centre. The newly introduced open water marathon events (10 km) were held on 20 and 21 August 2008 at Shunyi Olympic Rowing-Canoeing Park.

Swimming featured 34 events (17 male, 17 female), including two 10 km open-water marathons. The remaining 32 were contested in a 50 m long course pool within the Olympic Park.

The United States claimed a total of 31 medals (12 golds, 9 silver, and 10 bronze) in the leaderboard to maintain its standings as the most successful nation in swimming. A stellar performance in the pool also made an Olympic history for Michael Phelps, who captured eight gold medals to break Mark Spitz's 1972 record, a total of seven, at a single Games. Despite the male swimmers failing to attain a single gold in swimming, Australia managed to repeat a second-place effort on its third consecutive Olympics with 20 medals (six golds, six silver, and eight bronze). Meanwhile, Great Britain finished third with a total of six medals by the benefit of a sterling long-distance freestyle double from Rebecca Adlington.

A total of 25 world records and 65 Olympic records were set during the competition.

Venue

All the swimming, synchronized swimming, and diving events of the 2008 Olympics were held at the Beijing National Aquatics Center (better known as the "Water Cube"), which was claimed to be built to increase the speed of the swimmers. The lane lines, nicknamed "wave eaters", buffer the waves produced by swimmers while they stroke. The technological advances of the pool were enhanced by several advantages inherent to an indoor swimming venue, namely: temperature, humidity and lighting control. Even the wide decks were built to help give the swimmers a sense of space.

Events
The swimming program for 2008 was expanded from 2004, with the addition of the 10 km marathon open water swimming events, bringing the total number of events to 34 (17 each for men and women). The following events were contested (all pool events were long course, and distances are in metres unless stated):
Freestyle: 50, 100, 200, 400, 800 (women), and 1,500 (men);
Backstroke: 100 and 200;
Breaststroke: 100 and 200;
Butterfly: 100 and 200;
Individual medley: 200 and 400;
Relays: 4×100 free, 4×200 free; 4 × 100 medley
Open water: 10 kilometres

Schedule
Unlike the previous Olympics, swimming program schedule occurred in two segments. For the pool events, prelims were held in the evening, with semifinals and final in the following morning session, spanning a day between semifinals and finals in those events with semifinals. The shift of the normal morning prelims and evening finals (to evening prelims and morning finals) occurred for these Games because of the prior request made by US broadcaster NBC (due to the substantial fees NBC has paid for rights to the Olympics, the IOC has allowed NBC to have influence on event scheduling to maximize U.S. television ratings when possible; NBC agreed to a $7.75 billion contract extension on May 7, 2014, to air the Olympics through the 2032 games, which is also one of the major sources of revenue for the IOC), so that the finals from the event could be shown live in the United States.

Qualification

A National Olympic Committee (NOC) may enter up to 2 qualified athletes in each individual event if both meet the A standard, or 1 athlete per event if they meet the B standard. An NOC may also enter a maximum of 1 qualified relay team per event. NOCs may enter swimmers regardless of time (1 swimmer per sex) if they have no swimmers meeting qualifying B standard.

Participating nations
A total of 1,026 swimmers (571 men and 455 women) from 162 nations would compete in swimming events at these Olympic Games. American Samoa, Botswana, Comoros, Congo Democratic Republic, Cook Islands, Marshall Islands, and Tanzania made their official debut in swimming. Meanwhile, Belgium, Dominican Republic, Kuwait, Netherlands Antilles, and Tajikistan returned to the sport after an eight-year absence. Nations with swimmers at the Games are (team size in parentheses):

Medal summary

Medal table

Retrieved from 2008 NBC Olympics website.

Men's events

* Swimmers who participated in the heats only and received medals.

Women's events

* Swimmers who participated in the heats only and received medals.

Olympic and world records broken 
At the 2008 Summer Olympics, new world records were set 25 times (affecting 21 distinct world records) and new Olympic records were set 65 times and one other was equalled (affecting 30 distinct Olympic records). Only Ian Thorpe's 3:40.59 in the 400 metres freestyle and Inge de Bruijn's 56.61 in the 100 metres butterfly, both set in Sydney, remained Olympic records. Michael Phelps of the United States also broke the record for the most gold medals ever won by an Olympian with a total of 14; 8 of which were won during the 2008 Summer Olympics - this was also a world record.

Men

* World record split from the 4 × 100 m freestyle relay

Note: At the 4 × 100 m freestyle relay final, anchor Jason Lezak swam the fastest 100 m split (46.06); however, this is not considered an official FINA record, as he did not swim the first leg.

Women

LZR Racer suits

Another big change to swimming occurred when Speedo launched the LZR Racer swim suits on February 13, 2008. The suits, developed by the Australian Institute of Sport, were designed to repel water, allow oxygen to flow to the muscles, and hold the body in a more hydrodynamic position. The suits had been proven to give the swimmer a lower time by 1.9 to 2.2%. Due to the advantage provided by the suits, some swimmers complained about the fairness in its use, because some people used multiple swimsuits to improve buoyancy and compressing of body; the official blog for the National Collegiate Athletic Association pondered whether they were "technology doping" and what was the difference between gaining advantage from a swimsuit and gaining advantage from performance-enhancing drugs. In response to these complaints, the International Swimming Federation (FINA) scheduled a meeting with Speedo to discuss the suits. After the meeting, FINA dismissed the claims of cheating, and endorsed the suits for future swimming meets. By August 14, 2008, 62 world records had been broken by swimmers wearing the LZR Racer.

See also
Swimming at the 2008 Summer Paralympics
2008 in swimming

References

External links 
 Official Swimming Site
 NBC Olympics Coverage
Swimming – Official Results Book

 
2008 Summer Olympics events
O
2008 Summer Olympics
Swimming competitions in China
International aquatics competitions hosted by China